Kieran Gill (born 4 December 1995) is a rugby league footballer who plays for the Bradford Bulls in Betfred Championship.

Playing career

Castleford Tigers
He spent the 2019 season on-loan from the Castleford Tigers (Heritage № 977) at Newcastle.  Gill has previously played on loan for Oxford, Oldham (Heritage № 1366) and the Newcastle Thunder.

Bradford Bulls
On 22 September 2021, it was reported that he had signed for Bradford in the RFL Championship

References

External links
Cas Tigers profile
SL profile

1995 births
Living people
Bradford Bulls players
Castleford Tigers players
English rugby league players
Newcastle Thunder players
Oldham R.L.F.C. players
Oxford Rugby League players
Rugby league centres
Rugby league players from Yorkshire
Rugby league wingers